American hardcore punk band Code Orange has released four studio albums, three EPs, one live album, six other albums, and thirteen music videos.

Studio albums

EPs

Live albums

Remix albums

Other releases

Music videos

References

External links
 
Code Orange discography at AllMusic
Code Orange discography at Discogs
Code Orange discography at MusicBrainz

Discography
Discographies of American artists
Heavy metal group discographies